Princess Yelena "Hélène" Vasilyevna Kuragina is a fictional character in Leo Tolstoy's 1869 novel War and Peace and its various cinematic adaptations. She is played by Anita Ekberg in the 1956 film, by Amber Gray  in the New York stage premiere of Natasha, Pierre & The Great Comet of 1812, and by Tuppence Middleton in the 2016 BBC miniseries.

Biography
Hélène is described as being in her early to mid-twenties and is considered a great beauty. Within Petersburg society, she is considered very cultured and intelligent on account of her social graces, despite actually being quite vapid. Early in the novel, it is rumoured and later implied that Hélène has had an incestuous affair with her profligate brother, Anatole. 

After Pierre Bezukhov is legitimized as the heir to his father's title and fortune, Hélène's father, Prince Vasily Kuragin, arranges for the two of them to be married. Despite finding Pierre odd, Hélène goes through with the marriage for the sake of social and financial advantage. Pierre is at first thrilled to be married to such a beautiful woman, but he quickly sours on the match, especially after Hélène tells him she will never have children with him. Not long after they are married, Hélène has an affair with their houseguest, the crude but fearless soldier Dolokhov, who flaunts the romance. Pierre fights Dolokhov in a duel, and in a stroke of luck wins by wounding him. Pierre sinks into depression, losing all love for his wife. He leaves her and goes to St. Petersburg. Hélène begs him to maintain the marriage, which he does only for appearances, while she continues to engage in sexual affairs, most notably with Boris Drubetskoy. Continuing to pursue her social ambitions, she frequently hosts dinner parties for the elite, and her salon becomes extremely popular. Later, she conspires with Anatole to help him seduce Natasha Rostova, to whom Anatole is powerfully attracted.

Late in the novel, Hélène forsakes the Russian Orthodox Church and adopts Catholicism, believing a large donation to the church will lead the Pope to annul her union with Pierre so she can remarry. Soon afterward, Hélène falls ill due to pregnancy and dies; it is implied that she died from a drug overdose in an attempted abortion.

See also
List of characters in War and Peace

Characters in War and Peace
Fictional Russian people in literature
Female characters in literature
Literary characters introduced in 1869